Coate Water is a country park situated  to the southeast of central Swindon, England, near junction 15 of the M4.  It takes its name from its main feature, a reservoir originally built to provide water for the Wilts & Berks Canal.  Now named 'Coate Water Country Park', the lake and its surroundings are both a leisure facility and a nature reserve.

History 
The reservoir formed a  lake, built in 1822 by diverting the River Cole. Its primary purpose was to provide water for the canal and it remained outside the borough of Swindon until the borough's expansion in 1928. In 1914, with the canal abandoned, Coate became a pleasure park; changing rooms and a wooden diving board were added.

The structure was given Grade II listed protection in 2013. Restoration by Swindon Borough Council in 2022, at a cost of around £100,000, included reinstatement of the handrails.

Development plans 
In 2004, Swindon Borough Council and the University of Bath published plans to develop land next to the park as a campus, but the university later withdrew the proposals. Since then Persimmon Homes and Redrow Homes have submitted various planning applications. One was turned down and dismissed at a planning appeal. Another proposal for 900 houses and an industrial estate went to appeal in November 2011 and was allowed by the Secretary of State. Local residents began a Save Coate campaign, which drew attention to archaeological features and pointed out that development conflicted with several of Swindon Borough Council's environmental policies.

A buffer zone around the park was proposed in late 2006, although campaigners and local residents did not think this was enough. In a newspaper poll, 20 per cent of readers said they believed that the new plans would help to protect Coate Water. The issue was further compounded when Coate Water was voted "Swindon's Favourite Place" by the local population.

Archaeology 
The area has Mesolithic, Neolithic, Bronze Age, Iron Age, Romano-British and Medieval history that spans a period of 7000 years or more.

The oldest known ancient monuments nearby are the scheduled Day House Lane stone circle and the Bronze Age burial mounds along the lane, one of which is also scheduled. Further Middle Bronze Age cremations, a possible pond barrow, and two large ring ditches have been found on the opposite side of the small Day Brook valley. A large, regionally significant Mesolithic flint scatter, with some topologically late artifacts, is also present c.150m south west of Coate Stone Circle. Six stone circles were recorded in the 18th/19th and early 20th centuries, all in the Coate area, and possibly linked, at least in part, by avenues of large sarsen stones. The remains of one of the stone circles probably still lies at the bottom of Coate Water.

Other relevant archaeology listed on the Wiltshire and Swindon Historic Environment Records includes the Coate Mound, excavated with very little record in the earlier 20th century, which is spatially associated with the Mesolithic artifact scatter. Other ancient finds and sites occur in the area south to Badbury Wick, and across the Day Brook valley, in later periods. This includes obscure Neolithic activity, Middle Bronze Age farming, a Mid-late Bronze Age enclosed settlement at Badbury Wick, unenclosed Middle Iron Age buildings, a small Roman settlement, and a deserted medieval village.

Ecology

An area of 51.1 hectares of the lake and its margins has been notified as a biological Site of Special Scientific Interest, mainly for its breeding bird populations. Part of the site is also a local nature reserve.

Coate Water is a notable site for birds. The following rare-in-Wiltshire species have been recorded there:

 Bearded tit – a pair in October 1982
 Black-crowned night heron – adults in April 1978 and May 1990
 Black-throated diver – a non-breeding plumaged adult in February 1978
 Black Swan - one in February 2018
 Eurasian spoonbill – two adults in April 1978
 European shag – one in September 1993
 Grey phalarope – two juveniles in October 1987
 Little auk – one in January 1984
 Northern fulmar – one in June 1978
 Purple heron – a first-summer bird in May 1981
 Red-necked grebe – an adult in March/April 1995
 Red-throated diver – a juvenile in March 1979
 Ring-necked duck – a first-winter male in January 1998
 Rock pipit – one in March 1976
 Slavonian grebe – one in January 1982
Warblers
 Barred warbler – one in September 1980
 Savi's warbler – one in May 1965
 Yellow-browed warbler – one in September 1988

Activities 
Organisations based at the lake include Swindon Rowing Club and Coate Water Sailing Trust.

In fiction
Author Richard Jefferies (1848–1887) was born at Coate village, a short distance northeast of Coate Water in Chiseldon parish; his home is now a museum. The "New Sea" in his Bevis books was based on Coate Water.

References
https://library.thehumanjourney.net/828/1/B2005.14.pdfA.pdf

Bibliography
 Wiltshire Ornithological Society (2007) Birds of Wiltshire

External links

 Coate Water – Swindon Council's guide to the country park
 coatewater.com – Information and Forum
 Richard Jefferies Museum
 Swindon advertiser – 2008 non-development campaign
 Coate Water Miniature Railway

Parks and open spaces in Swindon
Sites of Special Scientific Interest in Wiltshire
Sites of Special Scientific Interest notified in 1971
Country parks in Wiltshire
Local nature reserves in Wiltshire
Lakes of Wiltshire